Great Britain sent a delegation to compete at the 1976 Summer Paralympics in Toronto, Ontario, Canada. Its athletes finished fifth in the overall medal count.

Medalists

Medals by sport

See also 
 Great Britain at the Paralympics
 Great Britain at the 1976 Summer Olympics

References 

Nations at the 1976 Summer Paralympics
1976
Summer Paralympics